Mayfield Cottage is a historic plantation house located near the grounds of Central State Hospital near Petersburg, Dinwiddie County, Virginia. It was built about 1750, and is a -story brick Colonial era mansion. The building features a jerkin-head roof and distinctive interior woodwork. It is believed to be the oldest existing brick house in Dinwiddie County. From 1885, the property was used by the hospital for its headquarters and the house was part of the hospital complex until 1969.

It was listed on the National Register of Historic Places in 1969.

References

External links
 Mayfield, U.S. Route 460 (moved from original location), Petersburg, Petersburg, VA at the Historic American Buildings Survey (HABS)

Plantation houses in Virginia
Houses on the National Register of Historic Places in Virginia
National Register of Historic Places in Dinwiddie County, Virginia
Houses completed in 1750
Colonial architecture in Virginia
Houses in Dinwiddie County, Virginia
Historic American Buildings Survey in Virginia